Watering the Flowers was an 1896 French short comedy film directed by Georges Méliès. It was released by Méliès's company Star Film and is numbered 6 in its catalogues. 
The film was made in imitation of the more famous Louis Lumière film L'Arroseur Arrosé. It is currently presumed lost.

See also
List of lost films

References

External links 
 
 L'Arroseur at SilentEra

1896 films
French black-and-white films
Films directed by Georges Méliès
French silent short films
1896 comedy films
Lost French films
French comedy short films
1890s lost films
Lost comedy films
1896 short films
Silent comedy films
1890s French films